Mong Kok East station – formerly Mong Kok railway station and Yaumati  – is a station on Hong Kong's . The station is connected to Grand Century Place, a large shopping mall.

History
The station, initially named Yaumati, was constructed on 1 October 1910 to cope with the opening of the British Section of Kowloon–Canton Railway. The station was later renamed Mong Kok on 31 December 1968 on the grounds that the station was actually in Mong Kok District.

In 1983, the station was rebuilt. A temporary station was in use just to the south (towards Hung Hom) during reconstruction. After the takeover of KCR operations by the MTR Corporation on 2 December 2007, the station was renamed to Mong Kok East. Before the MTR–KCR merger, this station shared a name with the separate Mong Kok station on the Tsuen Wan and Kwun Tong lines.

Station layout 

Platform 1 is the terminus platform for some southbound trains during peak hours and the train will return northbound towards Lo Wu or Lok Ma Chau. The platforms are curved and the platform gap is relatively large compared to other MTR stations.

Entrances/exits 
A: Government Offices Carpark
B: Mongkok Government Offices
C: Sai Yee Street
D: Grand Century Place

Nearby landmarks 
Grand Century Place (MOKO)
Royal Plaza Hotel
Yuen Po Street Bird Garden

References

External links
 

MTR stations in Kowloon
East Rail line
Mong Kok
Former Kowloon–Canton Railway stations
Railway stations in Hong Kong opened in 1969
1969 establishments in Hong Kong